James Donald (1917–1993) was an actor. 

James Donald may also refer to:

 James Donald (politician) (1889–1971), politician in Auckland, New Zealand
 Jim Donald (rugby union) (James George Donald, 1898–1981), New Zealand rugby player

See also
 Jim Donald (disambiguation)